Step 1 is an album by American jazz organist Jimmy McGriff recorded in late 1968 and first released on the Solid State label the following year.

Track listing
All compositions by Jimmy McGriff except where noted
 "Step One" − 3:34
 "South Wes" (Larry Frazier) − 3:36
 "Easter Parade" (Irving Berlin) − 2:54
 "Jimmy's Blues" − 8:10
 "For Once in My Life" (Ron Miller, Orlando Murden) − 4:52
 "Motoring Along" − 3:50

Personnel
Jimmy McGriff - organ
Blue Mitchell − trumpet
Danny Turner − alto saxophone
Arthur 'Fats' Theus − electric tenor saxophone
Bob Ashton − baritone saxophone
Larry Frazier − guitar
Jesse Kilpatrick Jr. − drums
Unidentified Female vocalists − background vocals (tracks 1 and 2)

References

Solid State Records (jazz label) albums
Jimmy McGriff albums
1969 albums
Albums produced by Sonny Lester